Wetzel County Schools is the school district within Wetzel County, West Virginia, United States.

Divisions
Wetzel County Schools is divided into four attendance areas: the Hundred area, the New Martinsville area, the Paden City area, and the Short Line area.

In the Hundred and Short Line areas one school serves Pre-Kindergarten through eighth grade and another school serves ninth through twelve. In New Martinsville, one school serves kindergarten through eighth grade and another school serves nine through twelve. In Paden City, one school serves kindergarten through sixth and another school serves seven through twelve. New Martinsville and Paden City share a pre-kindergarten facility that is located near New Martinsville. Wetzel County Schools is governed by the Wetzel County Board of Education.

Schools

Pre-kindergarten facility 
Wetzel County Center for Children and Families (Pre-K) (near New Martinsville)

Elementary and middle schools
 Long Drain School, Pre-K through grade 8, Hundred
 New Martinsville School, K through grade 8, New Martinsville
 Paden City Elementary School, K through grade 6, Paden City
 Short Line School, Pre-K through grade 8, Reader

High schools
 Hundred High School, grades 9–12, Hundred
 Magnolia High School, grades 9–12, New Martinsville
 Paden City High School, grades 7–12, Paden City
 Valley High School, grades 9–12, Pine Grove

School districts in West Virginia
Education in Wetzel County, West Virginia